The 2008 Northeast Conference baseball tournament began on May 22 and ended on May 24, 2008, at Bernie Robbins Stadium in Atlantic City, New Jersey.  The league's top four teams competed in the double elimination tournament.  Fourth-seeded  won their first tournament championship and earned the Northeast Conference's automatic bid to the 2008 NCAA Division I baseball tournament.

Seeding and format
The top four finishers were seeded one through four based on conference regular-season winning percentage.

Bracket

All-Tournament Team
The following players were named to the All-Tournament Team.

Most Valuable Player
Josh Vittek was named Tournament Most Valuable Player.  Vittek hit .458 with eight runs scored, five home runs and 12 RBI for the Tournament.

References

Tournament
Northeast Conference Baseball Tournament
Northeast Conference baseball tournament
Northeast Conference baseball tournament